Two human polls and one formulaic ranking make up the 2002 NCAA Division I-A football rankings. Unlike most sports, college football's governing body, the National Collegiate Athletic Association (NCAA), does not bestow a National Championship title for Division I-A football. That title is primarily bestowed by different polling agencies. There are several polls that currently exist. The main weekly polls are the AP Poll and Coaches Poll. About halfway through the season the Bowl Championship Series (BCS) standings are released.

Legend

AP Poll

Coaches Poll

BCS standings
The Bowl Championship Series (BCS) determined the two teams that competed in the BCS National Championship Game, the 2003 Fiesta Bowl.

References

2002 NCAA Division I-A football rankings
NCAA Division I FBS football rankings
Bowl Championship Series